Harrow County Grammar School may refer to one of two schools closed in 1975:
Harrow County School for Boys, a grammar school now an academy called Harrow High School
Harrow County School for Girls, a grammar school no longer in existence

Defunct schools in the London Borough of Harrow